Daniel Hogan may refer to:

 Daniel Hogan (Lieutenant-General) (1895–?), Irish Defence Forces Chief of Staff, 1927–1929
 Daniel Hogan (sailor) (died 1818), sailor in the United States Navy
 Daniel Hogan (Irish politician) (1899–1980), Irish Fianna Fáil politician, TD for Laois-Offaly and later a Senator
 Daniel Hogan (Illinois politician) (1849–1912), Irish American politician, Illinois Senate